The men's 400 metre freestyle competition of the swimming events at the 1983 Pan American Games took place on 20 August. The last Pan American Games champion was Brian Goodell of US.

This race consisted of eight lengths of the pool, with all eight being in the freestyle stroke.

Results
All times are in minutes and seconds.

Heats

Final 
The final was held on August 20.

References

Swimming at the 1983 Pan American Games